"You Already Know" is a song recorded by American singer Fergie, featuring guest vocals from Trinidadian-American rapper Nicki Minaj. It was released on August 25, 2017, alongside promotional single "Hungry" as the fourth single from Fergie's second studio album, Double Dutchess (2017), the same day the album was made available for pre-order. "You Already Know" impacted mainstream and rhythmic radio on September 12, 2017. As of September 2017, "You Already Know" moved almost 56,600 copies in the United States according to Nielsen SoundScan.

Background
"You Already Know" has been described as a song with 1990s house influences. It samples "It Takes Two" by Rob Base and DJ E-Z Rock, which in turn samples the Lyn Collins 1972 song "Think (About It)". Prior to the song's release, a lyric about Minaj's ex-boyfriend Meek Mill, was changed following their breakup in January 2017. The single was written by Fergie and Minaj, with will.i.am handling the song's production. Fergie first teased the collaboration in a radio interview in late 2014 while promoting "L.A. Love (La La)". The song was performed live for the first time on Rock in Rio Lisboa on May 20, 2016.

Fergie spoke about the song, saying:

Critical reception
Jordan Miller of Breathe Heavy reacted positively towards the song, calling it "fresh to death". In particular he praised Minaj's verse. Stereogum placed the song as the third best track of the week, with the senior editor Tom Breihan calling it a monster: "It's a big, shameless endorphin-rush pop megablast, a riot of synth-bloop hooks and James Brown drum-breaks and house pianos and ecstatic diva-wails.". Breihan also shows surprise with Fergie's rap skills. It was considered the fortieth best song of 2017 by Rolling Stone.

Personnel
Taken from Tidal.
 Fergie – vocals, performer, songwriter
 Nicki Minaj – vocals, featured artist, performer, songwriter
 will.i.am – producer
 Joel Metzler – vocal producer
 Aubrey Delaine – vocal producer
 Johannes Raasina – mixing engineer
 Padraic Kerin – engineer
 Joe Peluso – engineer

Charts

Release history

References

2017 songs
2017 singles
Fergie (singer) songs
Nicki Minaj songs
Songs written by Fergie (singer)
Songs written by Nicki Minaj
Songs written by James Brown
Song recordings produced by will.i.am
Songs written by will.i.am
Songs written by Big Daddy Kane
Black-and-white music videos